Nuntii Latini is the name of several news services that broadcast in Latin.

Finnish Nuntii Latini 
The Finnish Nuntii Latini was a Finnish news service broadcast in Latin between September 1989 and June 2019 by the Finnish national broadcaster Yle (Radiophonia Finnica Generalis) on the Yle Radio 1 channel. The name Nuntii Latini is Latin for Latin News or News in Latin.

Station output 
There was a five-minute long weekly broadcast of recent world news and human interest. The program was eventually made available on the Internet and had about 40,000 listeners according to RTÉ in 2019, compared to 75,000 reported by the BBC in 2006. Articles were usually alternately read by a male and female announcer, in Latin. Pronunciation was, for the most part, "classical" and listeners could follow a written transcript of news items. A "Glossarium programmatis" was provided for each program translating 6 to 10 of the key Latin terms into Finnish, English, and German.

The program was founded by Tuomo Pekkanen, a professor of Latin. As of 2013, Laura Nissinen was one of the announcers. The program has been described as one of several ways in which Finland has been a bastion of Latin, such as the translation of the works of Elvis Presley into Latin by Finnish academic Jukka Ammondt.

Shutdown 
In November 2017, Yle announced that they would be shutting down the broadcast in December of that year. Yle cited the availability of other Latin-language media on the internet as one of the reasons for the shutdown. Another reason was the difficulty in finding suitable replacements for the programme's ageing producers. The announcement resulted in a public campaign to save the program. More than 3,000 listeners wrote to the station in protest, resulting in the show being extended through 2019. The final broadcast was on 14 June 2019.

External links 
 Finnish Nuntii Latini: 
 Glossarium programmatis at Yle; Glossaria 2016 and earlier
 German Nuntii Latini: 
 Vatican Nuntii Latini: 
 Italian Nuntii Latini or Nuntii Latini Italici: 
 US-American Nuntii Latini or Nuntii Latini Occidentalis Studiorum Universitatis Vasintoniensis: nuntiilatini.com

References 

Radio in Finland
Latin-language mass media
1989 establishments in Finland
Yle original programming
1989 radio programme debuts
2019 radio programme endings
2019 disestablishments in Finland